Cheta may refer to:

 Cheta (armed group), a type of armed band of the Ottoman Balkans
 Chaeta, part of some invertebrates' anatomy
 Cheta (woreda), an administrative division of Ethiopia
 Cheta, SBS Nagar, a village in India
 Cheta language, a language of Brazil
 Cheta Emba (born 1993), American rugby player
 Cheta Ozougwu (born 1988), American football player
 Cheta, a 2016 song by  Nigerian gospel singer, Ada Ehi

See also 
 Ceta (disambiguation)
 Cheeta
 Chetan (disambiguation)
 Kheta (disambiguation)